An umbrella fund is a collective investment scheme that exists as a single legal entity but has several distinct sub-funds which, in effect, are traded as individual investment funds.

This type of arrangement originated in the European investment management industry, most notably with the SICAV (an open-ended collective investment). The SICAV model was copied for the UK Open-ended investment company (OEIC) and offshore fund models.

Advantages
The umbrella fund structure makes it cheaper for investors to move from one sub-fund to another and saves the investment manager costs relating to regulatory duplication.
An umbrella fund can also be set up to provide retirement, death and other benefits to members of a participating employer. In such a fund there are several participating employers who enjoy more or less the same benefits and the fund is managed by professional trustees. They cut the cost by saving on maintenance and management fees and sometimes take advantage of reduced tax rates.

See also
Collective investment schemes
Investment management
Mutual funds
OEIC
SICAV

Other umbrella terms
Umbrella brand
Umbrella organization
Umbrella school
Umbrella term

References

Investment funds